Robert Hardin Marr (October 29, 1819 – November 18, 1892) was a justice of the Louisiana Supreme Court from January 9, 1877, to April 5, 1880.

Life and career
Born in Clarksville, Tennessee, Marr was a Presidential Elector for John Bell in 1860. A judge of Louisiana's First Judicial District Court (Orleans Parish), Marr "[l]ed a riot to overthrow the Reconstruction government of Louisiana".

Marr was one of five justices appointed by Governor Francis T. Nicholls following a contested election in which both Nicholls and his opponent claimed victory, and each attempted to set up a government. Federal authorities ultimately recognized Nicholls as the legitimate governor, and his appointments stood. He was later president of the 1874 Democratic State Convention.

Personal life and death
His son, Robert H. Marr Jr., became an Orleans Parish district attorney and judge.

Marr died in New Orleans.

References

1819 births
1892 deaths
People from Clarksville, Tennessee
1860 United States presidential electors
Justices of the Louisiana Supreme Court
19th-century American judges